The Gang of Four in the politics of Afghanistan was a group of Khalqist government officials consisting of Aslam Watanjar (Minister of Interior), Sayed Muhammad Gulabzoy (Minister of Communications),  (Minister of Border Affairs), and Asadullah Sarwari (Director of State Security), who supported Nur Muhammad Taraki in his power struggle against Hafizullah Amin in 1979.

References 

Political history of Afghanistan
Afghanistan–Soviet Union relations
Factions of the People's Democratic Party of Afghanistan
People granted political asylum in the Soviet Union